Palanda may refer to:
Palanda Canton, a canton of Ecuador
Palanda, Ecuador, a town in Palanda Parish (:es:Palanda), in Palanda Canton
Palanda, one of the names for Lasippa, a genus of Asian butterflies
Hyloxalus cevallosi, common name Palanda rocket frog